In cartography, an equal-area projection, also known as equivalent projection and authalic projection, is a map projection that preserves area measure, generally distorting shapes in order to do that. A conformal map projection cannot be equal-area and vice versa.

Several equivalent projections were developed in an attempt to minimize the distortion of countries and continents of planet Earth, keeping the area constant. Equivalent projections are widely used for thematic maps showing scenario distribution such as population, farmland distribution, forested areas, etc.

Description 
Equal area representation implies that a region of interest in a particular portion of the map will share the same proportion of area as in any other part of the map.

Statistical grid 

The term "statistical grid" refers to a discrete grid (global or local) of an equal-area surface representation, used for data visualization, geocode and statistical spatial analysis.

List of equal-area projections 

These are some projections that preserve area:

 Azimuthal
 Lambert azimuthal equal-area
 Wiechel
 Conic
 Albers
 Lambert equal-area conic projection
 Pseudoconical
 Bonne
 Bottomley
 Werner
 Cylindrical
 Lambert cylindrical equal-area (0°)
 Behrmann (30°)
 Hobo–Dyer (37°30′)
 Gall–Peters (45°)
 Pseudocylindrical
 Boggs eumorphic
 Collignon
 Eckert II, IV and VI
 Equal Earth
 Goode's homolosine
 Mollweide
 Sinusoidal
 Tobler hyperelliptical
 Eckert-Greifendorff
 McBryde-Thomas Flat-Polar Quartic Projection
 Hammer
 Strebe 1995
 Snyder equal-area projection, used for geodesic grids.

See also 
 Authalic latitude
 Authalic radius
 Equiareal map (mathematics)
 Measure-preserving dynamical system
 Geodesic polygon area

References